Broad-leaved pondweed is a common name for several plants and may refer to:

Potamogeton amplifolius, native to North America
Potamogeton natans, native to the northern hemisphere, and known as broad-leaved pondweed in the British Isles